The Place du Louvre is a square immediately to the east of the Palais du Louvre in Paris, France. To the south is the Quai du Louvre and beyond that is the River Seine. The Hôtel du Louvre is also located here, between the Louvre Palace and the Palais Royal.

The clearing of cluttered buildings to create the Place was accomplished by Baron Haussmann in the 1850s.

References 

Louvre
Art gallery districts
Louvre Palace
Buildings and structures in the 1st arrondissement of Paris
1850s establishments in France